Teresa A. Bell ( Zarzeczny, born August 28, 1966 in Washington Crossing, Pennsylvania) is an American rower.

References

External links
 
 
 

1966 births
Living people
Rowers at the 1996 Summer Olympics
Olympic silver medalists for the United States in rowing
American female rowers
Medalists at the 1996 Summer Olympics
21st-century American women